John Stokesley (8 September 1475 – 8 September 1539) was an English clergyman who was Bishop of London during the reign of Henry VIII.

Life
Stokesley was born at Collyweston in Northamptonshire, and became a fellow of Magdalen College, Oxford, in 1495, serving also as a lecturer. He graduated MA in 1500, and was successively ordained a deacon in 1504, a priest in 1505, and then proceeded DTh in 1516. In 1498 he was made principal of Magdalen Hall, and in 1505 vice-president of Magdalen College. Soon after 1509 he was appointed a member of the royal council, and chaplain and almoner to Henry VIII; he attended Henry as his chaplain at the Field of the Cloth of Gold in 1520. He succeeded his relative Richard Stokesley as rector of North Luffenham, Rutland, in 1527.

In 1529 and 1530 he went to France and Italy as ambassador to Francis I and to gain opinions from foreign universities in favour of the king's divorce from Catherine of Aragon.

He became Bishop of London and Lord Almoner in 1530, and in September 1533 christened the future Queen Elizabeth. His later years were troubled by disputes with Archbishop Cranmer; Stokesley opposed all changes in the doctrines of the church, remaining hostile to the English Bible and fought to maintain all seven traditional sacraments, shrines and pilgrimages. Stokesley was a staunch opponent of Lutheranism, and very active in persecuting heretics, claiming himself to have caused more than 30 to be executed.

In May 1538, the King's attorney took out a writ of Praemunire against Stokesley and, as accessories with him, against the Abbess Agnes Jordan and the Confessor-General of Syon Abbey. Stokesley acknowledged his guilt, implored Thomas Cromwell's intercession, and threw himself on the King's mercy. He obtained the King's pardon.

He was one of the primary architects of the Six Articles of 1539, which enshrined traditional religion into law. They became law in June 1539.

Stokesley died on 8 September 1539, and was buried at St Paul's Cathedral on 14 September 1539.

Works
Stokesley was a man of learning. He was well-versed in philosophy and theology, and had knowledge of the classical languages of Latin, Greek, and Hebrew. He wrote in favour of Henry's divorce, and with Cuthbert Tunstall, Bishop of Durham, a treatise against Henry VIII's kinsman Cardinal Pole.

References

Sources

 
 
 
 .
 
 

1470s births
1539 deaths
16th-century English Roman Catholic bishops
People from North Northamptonshire
Bishops of London
Fellows of Magdalen College, Oxford
15th-century English people
16th-century English educators